Nyegyi Kangtsang (also known as Katoie Gyang by Puroik people and Kra-Daadi by Nyishi people) is a mountain of the Eastern Himalayas located in East Kameng district of Arunachal Pradesh state of India on the border with Tibet.

Location 

Katoie Gyang is one of the highest mountains in Arunachal Pradesh. The Kameng or Kaming (as referred to by Nyishi people) or Katoie Kwa Pi as referred to by Puroik people, is one of the most important rivers in Arunachal Pradesh. The Kameng or Katoie Kwa Pi is fed by several glaciers such as Katoie Gyang Glacier on the eastern flank of Katoie Gyang. The northern flank of the mountain is drained by the Subansiri.

Climbing history 
On October 23, 1995 five members of an Indian expedition under the leadership of MP Yadav claimed to have succeeded in the first ascent of the Nyegi Kantsang over the northeast ridge. However, it was later found that the team reached a point about 600 meters below the main summit, and the peak is still unclimbed.

See also
 List of Ultras of the Himalayas

References

Mountains of Tibet
Seven-thousanders of the Himalayas
Mountains of Arunachal Pradesh